Walter Reynell (died 1478) of Malston in the parish of Sherford, Devon, was a Member of Parliament for Devon in 1454/55.

Origins
He was a son of Walter Reynell (fl.1404) a Member of Parliament for Devon in 1404, by his second wife Margaret Stighull, daughter and heiress of William Stighull (alias Styl, Stigill, etc.) of Malston and East Ogwell, by his wife Elizabeth Malston, daughter and heiress of Robert Malston of Malston. His younger brother was John Reynell (fl.1427/8), a Member of Parliament for Devon in 1427/8, who married Agnes Chichester, a daughter of the Chichester family then recently seated at Raleigh in the parish of Pilton, Devon.

Marriage and children

He married Joane Walrond, a daughter of William Walrond of Bradfield in the parish of Uffculme in Devon. This marriage is symbolised on the base of the monument in East Ogwell Church to the couple's great-grandson Richard Reynell(1519-1585), MP, namely an heraldic escutcheon on the base of his chest tomb displaying the arms of Reynell impaling Walrond (Argent, three bull's heads cabossed sable armed or). By his wife he had children including:
Robert Reynell, who predeceased his father, having married Thomasine Hatch, the senior line of whose family was seated at Woolleigh in the parish of Beaford, Devon. He had a son John Reynell who died childless having married Jane Holwell, a daughter of Sir .... Holwell of Holwellsarke.
Walter Reynell of Malston and of East Ogwell, 2nd son and heir, who married twice: 
Firstly to Joane Whiting, a daughter of Robery Whiting, without children; 
Secondly to Radegund Copleston, a daughter of Philip Copleston (fl.1471/2) of Copplestone in Devon, Sheriff of Devon in 1471/2, by his wife Anne Bonville, daughter and heiress of John Bonville (1417–1494) of Shute, nephew of William Bonville, 1st Baron Bonville (1392–1461) of Shute. As Pole (d.1635) stated: "By this match of Bonvile's daughter the estate of Copleston was greatly augmented". Her brother was Raphe Copleston (died 1491), called "The Great Copleston" for his great revenue. By Radegund Coppleston he had 4 sons and two daughters, including:
John Reynell of East Ogwell, eldest son and heir and father of Richard Reynell(1519-1585), of East Ogwell, MP;
Thomas Reynell of Malston, 2nd son, to whom his father gave the manor of Malston, where he established his own family line.
Margaret Reynell, wife of Richard Champernowne of Instow, Devon.
Jane Reynell, wife of John Stretchleigh of Stretchleigh (today "Strashleigh") in the parish of Ermington, Devon.

References

1478 deaths

Year of birth unknown
Members of the Parliament of England (pre-1707) for Devon
Reynell family
English MPs 1455